the Corfu dwarf goby (Knipowitschia goerneri) is a species of freshwater goby endemic to the island of Corfu in western Greece.  This species can reach a length of  SL. This species was only recorded from a single spring and was considered to have been last recorded in 1983 but surveys in the 1990s failed to find any, it was incorrectly thought that the spring which was the type locality had been affected by water abstraction which may have caused an increase in salinity, but the species had not been recorded at the affected spring.  In 2014, nine specimens of Corfu dwarf goby were collected from Korission Lagoon in southern Corfu. The specific name honours Manfred Görner, who supported the author's ichthyological research.

References

Corfu
Knipowitschia
Freshwater fish of Europe
Fish of Europe
Endemic fauna of Greece
Fish described in 1991
Taxonomy articles created by Polbot